Sri Vidya Nilayam High School (also called SVN High School) was opened in Vidhya Nagar, Eluru in June 1959 on Eluru-Jangareddygudem (SH-44). It has 168 students studying from 6th to 10th class. It is also called as Vidya Nilayam School.

References

Schools in Andhra Pradesh
Education in Eluru
1959 establishments in Andhra Pradesh
Educational institutions established in 1959